Walkamin is a town and a locality in the Tablelands Region, Queensland, Australia.

Geography 
Walkamin is on the Atherton Tableland in Far North Queensland between Mareeba and Tolga. The Kennedy Highway traverses the locality from the south-east to the north-east passing through the town.

Climate
The town has a tropical savannah climate (Aw).

History 
The name Walkamin was taken from its railway station, which in turn was named by the Queensland Railways Department on 8 November 1943, based on a suggestion by organist Sydney Lionel May who proposed it because it was the name of an Aboriginal language associated with the area, probably the Wakaman language documented by Norman Tindale.

Walkamin State School opened on 19 May 1958. In 1982 the school celebrated its 25th anniversary.

The Walkamin Research Station was established by the Queensland Government in late 1959 to investigate the economic use of irrigation water from the Tinaroo Dam.

Education and research 
Walkamin State School is a government co-educational primary (P-6) school at 40 Wattle Street. In 2016, the school had an enrolment of 51 students with 3 teachers and 6 non-teaching staff (3 full-time equivalent).

In 2017, Walkamin Research Station was involved in research involving local crops such as mangoes, peanuts, coffee, hardwoods, legumes, maize and lucerne. Although the research station is equipped for aquaculture research, there were no aquaculture projects in 2017. The research station has an experimental farm in Kairi beside the shores of Lake Tinarooo.

Attractions 
The Mount Uncle Distillery makes a range of liqueurs from local fruits. In 2015, the distillery were successful at the International Wine and Spirit Competition in Hong Kong, winning a gold medal for their Iridium rum, silver medals for their gin, vodka and whiskey, and a bronze medal for another rum. The distillery owner, Mark Watkins, believes the climate in Walkamin contributes to faster maturation of the liqueurs.

The FNQ Country Music Festival and Talent Search is held annually at Kerribee Park Rodeo Grounds in Mareeba. The event is hosted by the Walkamin Country Music Club.

References

Further reading

External links 

Towns in Queensland
Populated places in Far North Queensland
Tablelands Region
Localities in Queensland